Mákina is a subgenre of hardcore techno, originating in Spain. Similar to UK hardcore dance, it includes elements of bouncy techno and hard trance. The tempo ranges from 150 to 180 BPM.

History

Early 1990s: origins
Dance music in Spain became prominent in 1988 with the rise of acid house. Màkina followed this trend and has its origins in the early 1990s in Valencia, Spain. Derived from another style called bakalao, the local name given to an association of electronic dance music played together with pop and rock tunes in Valencian clubs in the second half of the 1980s.

Mid-1990s: breakthrough and success
The genre gained prominence in 1991 when Spanish producer Chimo Bayo released his single, "Así me gusta a mí". The song was a success throughout Europe and the genre soon gained prominence. The genre became extremely popular throughout Spain from 1995 to 1997, as many Màkina oriented singles reached number one on the Spanish Singles Chart. Spanish màkina group EX-3 had two number-one singles, "Extres" and "Ex-P-Cial" in 1995 and 1996, respectively. Perhaps the most recognized màkina single in the United States is "Streamline" by Newton, which was popularized by a 2006 Pepsi commercial starring Jimmy Fallon.

From the late 1990s to current times the genre is the staple of the rave scene in North East England and Scotland. Following the closures of the most prominent venues – in particular the New Monkey nightclub – its popularity has slightly faded in those areas and has been partially replaced with Scouse house. Despite this it still retains a strong cultural legacy; regularly heard blasting from coaches when Newcastle United and Sunderland AFC play away matches.

References

Hardcore music genres
Electronic dance music genres